El jinete negro (English: The Black Rider) may refer to:

El jinete negro (1958 film), directed by Chano Urueta
El jinete negro (1961 film), 1961 Mexican parody western directed by Rogelio A. González